Sofitel New York is a boutique hotel on West 44th Street in Midtown Manhattan in New York City, owned and managed by the Sofitel corporation. It is two blocks north of Bryant Park and the New York Public Library Main Branch and next to the New York Yacht Club. The hotel is inspired by French traditions in furnishings and theme, and the hotel staff are bilingual in French and English.

History
Construction on the hotel began in 1997, and it opened in 2000. The International Monetary Fund (IMF) was reportedly responsible for funding the project after a design by Brennan Beer Gorman was chosen in an architectural competition which included entries from architects such as Michael Graves & Associates. After construction the building was awarded the 2000 Emporis Skyscraper Award.

Strauss-Kahn rape allegation

On May 14, 2011, a 32-year-old housekeeper at the hotel, Nafissatou Diallo, an immigrant from Guinea, alleged that IMF Managing Director Dominique Strauss-Kahn raped her in his hotel room. She had walked into his room as he was having a shower although he had not yet checked out. Strauss-Kahn was at a New York airport where his plane was ready to take off when airport police asked that the plane be stopped a few minutes before takeoff. He was escorted off the plane and placed under arrest. The criminal case was dismissed and he settled out of court with his accuser in a civil case.

Architecture

The architectural design by Brennan Beer Gorman features limestone and glass, with a T-shaped base. The facade was architecturally inspired by Parisian Moderne limestone buildings. The facade is bronze and depicts three flying geese above in a large portal. DeSimone Consulting Engineers were the structural engineers for the building.

Ground floor
The ground floor contains the French restaurant Gaby and a gift shop selling French perfumery and cosmetics. Gaby is Art Deco inspired and is overlooked by head chef Sylvain Harribey. The New York Times describes the hotel's front desk as being positioned on the opposite end of the lobby, "which gives the entrance a serene quality". The hotel staff are bilingual in French and English. The lobby contains a double-height rotunda at its center, which has a wooden sculpture, a Central Park-themed mural, and a round staircase. The hotel contains a  Grand Ballroom with 2.5-story windows and 8 meeting rooms with a capacity of 10 to 60 people.

Rooms
Frommer's describes the hotel rooms as "spacious and ultra-comfortable, adorned with art from New York and Paris". The rooms also have king beds; bathrooms with showers and tubs; and soundproof walls and windows. The majority of the beds are cream or white or white with maroon trimmings and feature large paintings above the headboards. The bathrooms have Roger & Gallet bath amenities.

References

External links

Hotels in Manhattan
Hotels established in 2000
Sofitel
Midtown Manhattan